A crash cart or code cart (crash trolley in UK medical jargon) or "MAX cart" is a set of trays/drawers/shelves on wheels used in hospitals for transportation and dispensing of emergency medication/equipment at site of medical/surgical emergency for life support protocols (ACLS/ALS) to potentially save someone's life. The cart carries instruments for cardiopulmonary resuscitation and other medical supplies while also functioning as a support litter for the patient.

The crash cart was originally designed and patented by ECRI Institute founder, Joel J. Nobel, M.D., while a surgical resident at Philadelphia's Pennsylvania Hospital in 1965. MAX helped enhance hospital's efficiency in emergencies by enabling doctors and nurses to save time, thereby increasing the chances of saving a life.

The contents and organization of a crash cart vary from hospital to hospital, country to country, and specialty to specialty, but typically contain the tools and drugs needed to treat a person in or near cardiac arrest or another life-threatening condition. These include but are not limited to:
 Monitor/defibrillators, suction devices, and bag valve masks (BVMs) of different sizes
 Advanced cardiac life support (ACLS) drugs such as epinephrine, atropine, amiodarone, lidocaine, sodium bicarbonate, dopamine, and vasopressin
 First line drugs for treatment of common problems such as: adenosine, dextrose, epinephrine for IM use, naloxone, nitroglycerin, and others
 Drugs for rapid sequence intubation: succinylcholine or another paralytic, and a sedative such as etomidate, propofol or midazolam; endotracheal tubes and other intubating equipment
 Drugs for peripheral and central venous access
 Pediatric equipment (common pediatric drugs, intubation equipment, etc.)
 Other drugs and equipment as chosen by the facility

Hospitals typically have internal intercom codes used for situations when someone has suffered a cardiac arrest or a similar potentially fatal condition outside of the emergency department or intensive care unit (where such conditions already happen frequently and do not require special announcements).  When such codes are given, hospital staff and volunteers are expected to clear the corridors, and to direct visitors to stand aside as the crash cart and a team of physicians, pharmacists and nurses may come through at any moment. (See Code Blue.)

History in the United States
The first cardiac crash cart was created in 1962 at Bethany Medical Center in Kansas City, Kansas, home to the first Cardiac Care Unit in the country. The first crash cart was designed by a nurse and fabricated by the father of one of the doctors. It contained an Ambu bag, defibrillator paddles, a bed board and endotracheal tubes.

In computing
In the computer industry, the term crash cart is used, by analogy to its original meaning in medicine, to mean a cart that can be connected to a server that is malfunctioning so badly that remote access to it is impossible, the intention being to "resuscitate" the server to the point where remote administration works again. Crash carts most commonly include a keyboard, mouse, and monitor, because most servers in a modern high-density environment do not have user input/output devices.

Crash carts are a method of last resort in data centers which employ various forms of out-of-band management. In those cases it is used for equipment which does not support the requisite out-of-band infrastructure (OOBI) features or in cases where the OOBI devices (concentrators, switches, terminal servers, etc.) or services themselves have failed.

The term "crash cart" can also refer to a bootable removable medium containing an operating system and any relevant software used to recover computer equipment (such as a server or PC) from a state of failure. This is done when such recovery is not possible using the computer's existing operating system and software. Crash carts in this sense are historically tape cartridges ("carts") or more recently, external or removable hard drives.

References
Notes

External links

360-degree view of a crash cart and all its contents
Crash Cart Inventory Checklist (PDF)
Max, The Lifesaver; Life

Medical equipment
Out-of-band management